There are over 20,000 Grade II* listed buildings in England.  This page is a list of the 183 of these buildings in the ceremonial county of the East Riding of Yorkshire.

City of Kingston upon Hull

|}

East Riding of Yorkshire

|}

See also
 :Category:Grade II* listed buildings in the East Riding of Yorkshire

Notes

References 

National Heritage List for England

 
Lists of Grade II* listed buildings in England by county
East Riding of Yorkshire